Clergy Support Trust is a charity which provides support to Anglican clergy (serving and retired) and ordinands, and their families, in the UK and Ireland.

It was formerly known as Sons & Friends of the Clergy. The full official name of the charity is Governors of the Charity for Relief of the Poor Widows and Children of Clergymen.

The present charity resulted from an amalgamation of two Anglican clergy support charities in December 2012. The two parent organisations, the Corporation of the Sons of the Clergy and the Friends of the Clergy Corporation, date from 1655 and 1820 respectively.

The charity exists to provide financial and other support to serving or retired clergy of the Anglican Communion, with a main focus on clergy in the British Isles (that is the Church of England, including the Diocese in Europe, the Scottish Episcopal Church, the Church in Wales and the Church of Ireland, but also including missionary clergy serving overseas with an Anglican mission society). It also provides assistance to clergy widows, children, orphans, and other dependants.

Foundation
The Corporation of the Sons of the Clergy was established in 1655 in response to the distress of the large number of clergymen who were dispossessed of their livings under the regime of Oliver Cromwell. Those who were loyal to the crown and adhered to the traditional form of service were displaced. One of the main instigators of the charity was Edward Wake, who was uncle of William Wake, Archbishop of Canterbury. The founders were merchants of the City of London and priests of the Church of England, all of whom were themselves sons of clergymen. The first fundraising events were on 8 November 1655, when a Festival Service was held in Old St Paul's Cathedral, followed by a dinner in the Merchant Taylors' Hall. Collections were taken at each and these events have continued ever since. The charity also had generous support from important and influential people.

Royal Charter
When Charles II came to the throne, the supporters of the charity sent a message of loyal greeting and in 1678 the King granted the charity a Royal Charter. This Charter committed the administration of the “Charity for Releefe of the poore Widdowes and Children of Clergymen” to a “Court of Assistants”. The Court of Assistants consisted of a President, a vice-president, three Treasurers and up to forty-two Assistants, elected each year from the Governors. The Court first met on 15 July 1678 in the Jerusalem Chamber at Westminster Abbey. The corporation's President was John Dolben, Bishop of Rochester and Dean of Westminster, whilst the Vice-President was Sir Christopher Wren.

A modernised version of the Royal Charter, based on the model articles of association for a charity in England and Wales, was approved by the Governors of the charity in November 2019 and by the Queen (the charity's Patron) through an Order in Council in February 2020.

Sons of the Clergy
As time passed the corporation, maintaining its full name, but commonly operating under the shorter name "Sons of the Clergy", became a wider charity for clerical families and provided support such as the payment of the apprenticeship indentures. The charity obtained properties such as a house in Salisbury Square and other church land, and advowsons. The charity was not free from abuse. In 1731 Valens Comyn achieved great distinction in its service by uncovering the fraudulent activities of one of the Treasurers, who had been double listing widows whose pensions he was responsible for paying and lining his pockets on the proceeds.

Clergy Orphan Corporation

In 1749 a Society was formed for the purpose of founding both a Boys' and Girls' school for the maintenance and education of the orphans of Anglican Clergyman in England and Wales. This society was incorporated in 1809 as The Governors of the Society for Clothing, Maintaining, and Educating Poor Orphans of Clergymen of the Established Church in that part of the United Kingdom of Great Britain called England, until of Age to be put to Apprentice by Act 49 of George III of 28 April 1809. The common name for the organisation was the Clergy Orphan Corporation and the two schools it supported were generally known as the Clergy Orphan Schools.  Initially the boys were educated under a master in Thirsk in Yorkshire and the girls in a school-house in Chapel Street, Lisson Grove, Marylebone, London. The boys moved to Acton, London in 1805, and in 1812 both the girls and boys were moved to St John's Wood in London.

In 1852 Samuel Wilson Warneford, purchased a site for a new school in Canterbury and provided funds for the construction of a school and for scholarships. This led to the Boys' School moving to Canterbury and the Girls' School taking over the whole of the St John's Woods site.  The boys' school was renamed St Edmund's in 1897. It is now an independent co-educational schools for boys and girls from 3 to 18.

The girls' school was compulsorily purchased by a railway company in 1895 and demolished. The girls, after a temporary stay in Windsor, moved to a purpose built school at St Merry Hill Road, Bushey, Hertfordshire. The new school was designed by the renowned architect Alfred Waterhouse who was responsible for such buildings as the Natural History Museum in London and many other buildings. The school was named for Saint Margaret of Scotland. It is now an independent day and boarding school for girls.

The Schools Enquiry Commission report (1868) found that the expenditure on both schools was just under £7,500 in 1864, with roughly half for each school. The expenses of the charity administration, printing, appeals, elections, managing bequests etc., were approximately £730. Although both schools could nominally accommodate 100 pupils, there are accommodation for only 90 in the Girls' School. In the second half of 1886 there were 85 boarders in the Boys' School, and in 1864 there were 76 boarders in the Girls' School, although this rose to 83 before the Commission printed their report.

The two schools, St Edmund's School Canterbury and St Margaret's School, Bushey were incorporated as limited companies and separate charities on 20 May 1996 and no longer formed part of the Clergy Orphan Corporation. The Clergy Orphan Corporation was fully incorporated into the Corporation of the Sons of the Clergy in 1997, via Statutory Instrument 1997 No, 2240 "Charities".

Election to the schools
The school Bye-Laws provided that children would be elected into the Schools at the General Courts in May and November, and that elections would take place by ballot. A circular containing the name, age, and circumstances of the several candidates to each subscriber one month prior to the election. This was then returned with marks against the names that the subscriber supported. The annual subscription was £1 1s (one guinea). At the November 1868 General Court, ten boys and six girls were elected as students. The number of votes was from 3,139 to 4,717 for boys and 2,330 to 4,721 for girls. The system of electing students continued until 1903. A 1868 newspaper newspaper notices stated that a life subscription was ten guineas, but the Schools Enquiry Commission reports gave it as twenty guineas (£21). However the ten guinea figure appears to be correct as this was the lifetime subscription quoted in the appeal for the schools in October 1871.

Why the schools were needed
The reason that such schools were needed in the 19th century is simple. Farr's Life Table No. 3 show that in the period 1838 to 1864 an man who reached the age of 25, the age at which many young clergymen would have completed their academic training and been ordained, had an roughly one in three chance of dying before he was 55. In truth, the odds were better than this as Clergymen suffered lower mortality than other professions, and the risk of a clergyman of 25 dying by age 55 was about one in four in 1861–1871. Wyatt, in 1887, found the risk was less than one in six, but this analysis excluded the unhealthiest lives, and he noted that mortality rates for younger ages were reducing over time. By contrast, the latest life table from the UK's Office of National Statistics, Life Table No. 17 based on data in 20102012 shows that the risk of man aged 25 dying before 55 was less than one in twenty. The significant risk in the 18th and 19th centuries, that a clerical family would lose the main breadwinner before all of the children were launched into the world led to the founding of the Clergy Orphan Schools.

Not all churches in the UK suffered from this problem. Widows and orphans of the clergymen of the Presbyterian Scottish Establishment were not forced into poverty, as they benefited from annuities paid from the compulsory assurance scheme for the clergy of that church. The scheme was begun as a voluntary one, but was soon made compulsory. However, the editor of the Ecclesiastical Gazette commented that when considering the system of assurance in the Established Church in Scotland, It appears to be generally agreed that the compulsory system could not be worked conveniently in our own Church Establishment; but many think that a voluntary scheme might be adopted with great success. This statement was made in spite of the evidence from the Scottish scheme that it only worked once it was compulsory, and it also ignored the pertinent fact the voluntary solutions already existed through such as the Clergy Mutual Assurance Society. Over 7,000 clergy had joined the Clergy Mutual Assurance Society between 1829 and 1887.

Friends of the Clergy
In 1820 another charity was established for the relief of poor clergymen and their families. Founded by Phyllis Peyton and the writer Mary Lamb, the "Clothing Society for the Benefit of Poor Pious Clergymen" grew rapidly, and following several changes of name (and amalgamations with smaller charities, culminating in the Friends of the Clergy Corporation Act 1972), became in modern times the Friends of the Clergy Corporation.

The extent of clerical poverty
Only a fifth of the Anglican clergy active in 1839 had links to the Gentry or Peerage. Presumably, these had some inherited wealth. The others depended on what they could earn. About one quarter of the clergy were considered to be comfortably off, with at least £500 per annum in 1830. Ordained Church of England ministers had a number of potential sources of income:
 Direct employment as a curate, teacher, chaplain, or tutor. For example, Charles Kegan Paul, the founder of the publisher C. Kegan Paul, was employed as a tutor to pupils travelling to Germany for a year. He then appointed to a chaplaincy at Eton College and then to the new post of Master in College for which he was paid £120. He was allowed to supplement this by taking on two private pupils. Many clergy took private pupils as a way of supplementing their income. Paul's father had been forced to take on private pupils when the income from his West Indian holdings dried up. Curates might only be paid £50 a year, along with their board.
 Benefices commonly called livings, most of which benefited from Tithes and the Glebe, but some of which were Perpetual Curates. About half of the 10,500 livings were in the gift of the local squire. The remaining half were controlled by the crown, bishops, cathedral chapters, the universities of Oxford or Cambridge, and other institutions. In 1805, just over half (55%) of young clergymen could obtain such livings. A parliamentary inquiry in 1802 found that about 1,000 livings were worth less than £100 a year, and another 3,000 worth between £100 and £150. The picture was the same 30 years later and a tenth of beneficed clergymen received less than £100 a year. Of course, a clergyman might hold more than one living. This was known as pluralism. Jane Austen's clergyman father, George Austen, held two livings, at Steventon, Hampshire and at Deane, Hampshire. When George Austen retired he installed his son James as curate for both the livings he held, but retained the tithe income from Steventon as a form of pension. James Austen already held his own parish and with the curacies in Steventon and Deane, he now held three parishes, and was offered a fourth. The Pluralities Act of 1838 forbade clergymen having more than one benefice except under specific conditions. Charles Kegan Paul considered that the living he has been presented to by Eton College at Sturminster Marshall was a living of small value, bring worth less than £300. Paul supplemented his income by taking six pupils at £100 each per year. However, he noted that the presence of such unrelated young people in the home destroyed family life sadly. The desirable minimum income for a clergyman was thought to be £400, which was an upper middle-class income. Jervis reported that 6,750 parochial benefices were worth less than £300.

 Tithes a tenth part of the increase, from the profits on the land, the stock upon lands, and the personal industry of the inhabitants. Tithes were levied on everyone, regardless of whether they were member of the established church or not. However, the clergyman had to negotiate with his parishioners for the payment of the tithe. It is perhaps for this reason that there was a clerical charity called the Tithe Redemption Trust which assisted in the redemption of Tithe. 
 Profits from the Glebe lands. The area was an area within the parish used to support the parish priest. However, the Glebe lands were often small, and George Austen's Steventon living had only 3 acres in the Glebe. The Darne parish, where Austen also held the living, had 57 acres of Glebe land and Austen rented a farm of 195 acres from his patron Thomas Knight.
 Profits from farming. George's Austen's income from farming was equal to his tithe income. However, very few farmed any land other than their glebe.
 Stipends were paid to Perpetual Curates because their parishes had been created by elevating chapelries to parish status without splitting the tithes or glebe of the original parish. The stipend was often from an endowment, but might also be from fees, pew rents, and collections.

This is the reason why there were so many charities established to assist Clergymen and their widows and orphans. The list of such charities prepared by the editor of the Ecclesiastical Gazette in 1859 shows some 59 central, and 153 Diocesan charities for the assistance of the Clergy.

Amalgamation of charities
During the twentieth century the Sons of the Clergy Corporation and the Friends of the Clergy Corporation found increasing opportunities to support each other's work, and to cooperate on charitable projects. In 2005 they committed to finding a route to permanent union, with widespread sharing of resources. In 2006 they began a process of "common trusteeship" whereby the same people were appointed as Trustees of both charities. In 2007 the two Corporations moved into a single headquarters together, with a totally unified staff, remaining separate entities only in a legal and accountancy sense. The process of formally amalgamating the two Corporations was complex, but was completed in December 2012, when the Corporation of the Sons & Friends of the Clergy (usually referred to as just 'Sons & Friends of the Clergy") came into being. In March 2019 the charity changed its working name to Clergy Support Trust, to reflect the fact that almost a third of those in ordained Anglican ministry are now women, and the 'Sons & Friends' name was off-putting to many female clergy.

Charitable objects
The charity's objects, as enshrined in its 1678 Royal Charter as subsequently amended by Order in Council in 1971, 2012, 2017 and 2020, are to support eligible beneficiaries in:

...the relief or prevention of poverty or hardship or for the relief of illness and the promotion of health, whether physical or mental

"Beneficiaries" are defined as follows:

...members of the clergy, ordinands and the spouses, former spouses, children and dependants of living or deceased members or former members of the clergy or of ordinands.

Further definitions are as follows:

 "children" includes adopted children, step-children and persons treated as the children of a marriage or civil partnership.
 "civil partners" means the members of a civil partnership within the meaning of Section 1(1) of the Civil Partnership Act 2004.
 "clergy" and "members of the clergy" mean bishops, priests and deacons of the Anglican Communion.
 "ordinands" means persons who are preparing for ordination as members of the clergy.
 the "spouse" of a person means his or her wife, husband, civil partner, widow, widower or surviving civil partner.

Modern operations

Clergy Support Trust today is the largest charity helping clergy of the Anglican Communion in times of personal hardship, as well as their widows and other dependants. In 1998 Ross Clark wrote in The Independent that in the previous year 3,500 clergy had resorted to one of the two charities (still independent of each other at that date). This number has since fallen as the combined charity now focuses its work on those in greatest need. The charity is based in a Grade 2 listed building at 1 Dean Trench Street, Westminster, which address was for a while after WW1 the home of Winston Churchill. In 2019 the charity's income, mostly from investments, was £4.3 million, while the long-term investments as at 31 December 2019 totalled £117.3 million with another £2.4 million in net assets. The charity had seen a rise of £16.5 million in the value of its investments during the year.

Anglican clergy today receive broadly comparable stipend payments, starting at just under £25k a year for full-time clergy, unlike an earlier age when levels of payment varied enormously, according to the assets of the individual parish. Stipendiary clergy also usually receive a clergy house and associated expenses as part of their remuneration. Nonetheless, clergy and their dependants still sometimes find themselves in financial hardship. Grants are made to assist such clergy, and also in relation to health problems, whether physical or mental. In 2019 the charity expended a record £4.06 million on charitable activities, and £0.33 million on running the charity (including maintaining an office, appeals etc.). The charity also partners with other charities and organisations engaged in the well-being of Anglican clergy.

During the 1970s and 1980s the charity maintained and operated Chatsworth Gardens in Eastbourne as a clergy holiday home. This very large house, donated by the elderly owner during her lifetime, was converted into a series of large apartments, and whilst the donor continued to live in one herself, the others were maintained by the charity as clergy holiday flats. Many clergy families of that era have common memories of the Eastbourne clergy holiday homes. Chatsworth Gardens was however an expensive asset, and was eventually sold.

The Festival

The annual Festival service at St Paul's Cathedral, which began on 8 November 1655, has continued ever since, and is a major event annually in the calendar of the charity and of the cathedral. Senior clergy and City figures, including the Lord Mayor of London or his or her representative, are usually involved in the event, and in the life of the charity, with the Archbishop of Canterbury, Archbishop of York and Bishop of London serving as Presidents. With two cathedral choirs usually joining the choir of St Paul's, and with several composers such as Charles Villiers Stanford, Hubert Parry and Edward Elgar having written pieces for the event, the Festival is now one of the oldest and best known choral events in the Anglican Communion.

Festival cathedral choirs since 2000 (in addition to the Choir of St Paul's)

 2000: St Albans and the Temple Church Choir
 2001: Carlisle and St George's Chapel, Windsor
 2002: Chelmsford and Newcastle
 2003: Ely and Hereford
 2004: Various cathedral choirs (350th Festival)
 2005: New College, Oxford, and York
 2006: Derby and Winchester
 2007: Guildford and Christ Church, Oxford
 2008: Ripon and Truro
 2009: Exeter and Salisbury
 2010: Lincoln and Westminster
 2011: Edinburgh and Worcester
 2012: Bristol and Southwell
 2013: Norwich and Tewkesbury Abbey
 2014: Peterborough and Wakefield
 2015: Manchester and Portsmouth
 2016: Birmingham and St Edmundsbury
 2017: Chester and Chichester
 2018: Chelmsford and Gloucester
 2019: Canterbury and Coventry
 2020: Cancelled
 2021: Cancelled
 2022: Liverpool and Southwark
 2023: Leicester and Llandaff

Executive leadership
Register of the Corporation of the Sons of the Clergy

 1678 to 1679: Henry Symonds
 1679 to 1711: Thomas Tyllott
 1711 to 1731: William Pocklington
 1731 to 1741: Valens Comyn
 1741 to 1759: Stephen Comyn (father of Stephen George Comyn, the naval chaplain to Lord Nelson)
 1759 to 1788: Thomas Wall

Registrar of the Corporation of the Sons of the Clergy

 1788 to 1803: John Topham
 1803 to 1808: Henry Stebbing (son of the Revd Henry Stebbing, the English churchman and controversialist)
 1808 to 1833: John Grimwood
 1833 to 1848: Oliver Hargreave
 1848 to 1878: Charles J Baker
 1878 to 1919: Sir W Paget Bowman (son of Sir William Bowman, 1st Baronet, the famous surgeon) 
 1919 to 1936: Major Aldred C. Rowden (father of Diana Rowden, a WW2 heroine)
 1936 to 1947: Eustace Baillie Reynolds
 1947 to 1960: H Dennis Chignell
 1960 to 1972: Brigadier Guy O N Thompson DSO OBE
 1972 to 1981: Brigadier Ian M Christie
 1983 to 2000: R Christopher F Leach MBE
 2000 to 2012: Robert Welsford
 2012 to 2012: Andrew Gray

Registrar of Sons & Friends of the Clergy and later Clergy Support Trust (Chief Executive from 2017)

 2012 to 2015: The Rt Revd Graeme Knowles 
 2015 to 2017: Tim Jeffery (Interim)
 2017 to 2020: Jeremy Moodey
 2020 to the present: Ben Cahill-Nicholls

Officers of the charity

Presidents

 1678 to 1683: John Dolben, Bishop of Rochester and Dean of Westminster
 1683 to 1684: Peter Gunning, Bishop of Ely
 1684 to 1690: Francis Turner, Bishop of Ely
 1690 to 1697: William Lloyd, Bishop of St Asaph
 1697 to 1716: Thomas Tenison, Archbishop of Canterbury

From 1716 to 2017 the post of President was always held ex officio by the Archbishop of Canterbury. In November 2017 Archbishop Justin Welby became Honorary President.

Vice Presidents (usually a senior judge)

 1678 to 1683: Sir Christopher Wren (also held office from 1722 until his death in March 1723)
 1689 to 1696: Sir William Gregory, judge and parliamentarian
 1696 to 1705: Sir Thomas Meres MP (also held office from 1706 to 1707)
 1705 to 1706: Sir Nathan Wright, Lord Keeper of the Great Seal
 1723 to 1741: The Hon Sir John Verney, Master of the Rolls 
 1741 to 1761: Sir John Willes, Chief Justice of the Court of Common Pleas
 1762 to 1778: Sir Sidney Smythe
 1778 to 1806: Sir John Skynner, Chief Baron of the Exchequer
 1806 to 1818: Lord Ellenborough, Lord Chief Justice
 1818 to 1823: Sir Richard Richards, Lord Chief Baron of the Exchequer
 1823 to 1829: Lord Tenterden, Lord Chief Justice of the King's Bench
 1829 to 1846: Sir Nicholas Tindal, Chief Justice of the Court of Common Pleas
 1846 to 1854: Lord Denman, Lord Chief Justice of England
 1854 to 1868: Lord Cranworth, Lord High Chancellor of Great Britain
 1868 to 1878: Lord Chelmsford, Lord Chancellor
 1878 to 1880: Lord Hatherley, Lord Chancellor
 1880 to 1891: Lord Powis, Conservative peer and great grandson of Clive of India
 1891 to 1899: Lord Herschell, Lord Chancellor
 1899 to 1909: Lord Egerton, Conservative peer
 1909 to 1916: Lord Alverstone, initially Lord Chief Justice
 1916 to 1938: Lord Parmoor, Liberal peer and politician 
 1938 to 1945: Lord Ancaster GCVO, Conservative politician
 1945 to 1965: Sir Harry Vaisey, judge and expert on ecclesiastical law
 1965 to 1981: Sir Denys Buckley, later Lord Justice of Appeal
 1981 to 1996: Lord Templeman, Lord of Appeal in Ordinary
 1996 to 2004: Lord Lloyd of Berwick, initially a Lord of Appeal in Ordinary
 2004 to 2016: Sir John Chadwick, Lord Justice of Appeal from 1997 to 2007

Incorporated bodies
Over the many years of history of this charity, its legal status has changed several times, and a large number of smaller charities have been incorporated into it by merger, amalgamation, or takeover. The following former clergy charities are all now incorporated into the current day Corporation of the Sons & Friends of the Clergy:

 Charity for Relief of the poor Widows and Children of Clergymen
 Clergy Orphan Corporation
 Clothing Society for the Benefit of Poor Pious Clergymen
 Corporation of the Sons of the Clergy
 Curates Augmentation Fund
 Friends of the Clergy Corporation
 Poor Clergy Relief Corporation
 Poor Parochial Clergy Society
 Society of Stewards and Subscribers for Maintaining and Educating Poor Orphans of Clergymen

References

Sources
 Gentleman’s Magazine; March 1785
 Gentleman's Magazine; January 1817
 PEARCE, Ernest Harold The Sons of the Clergy, 1655-1904. London: John Murray, 1904 
 COX, Nicholas Bridging the Gap: A History of the Corporation of the Sons of the Clergy Over 300 Years, 1655-1978. Oxford: Becket Publications, 1978 .
 Ross Clark '"Poverty in the vicarage" Independent, The (London), Sep 14, 1998

External links
 Clergy Support Trust

Church of England societies and organisations
Organisations based in the City of Westminster
Religion in the City of Westminster
Religious charities
1655 establishments in England
1820 establishments in England